Zabrus boldorii is a species of ground beetle in the Pterostichinae subfamily that is endemic to Albania.

Beetles described in 1943
Beetles of Europe
Endemic fauna of Albania
Zabrus